Yurinsky (masculine), Yurinskaya (feminine), or Yurinskoye (neuter) is the name of several rural localities in Russia:
Yurinsky, Orenburg Oblast, a settlement in Pushkinsky Selsoviet of Krasnogvardeysky District of Orenburg Oblast
Yurinsky, Yaroslavl Oblast, a crossing loop in Makarovsky Rural Okrug of Rybinsky District of Yaroslavl Oblast
Yurinskaya, Moscow Oblast, a village in Ramenskoye Rural Settlement of Yegoryevsky District of Moscow Oblast
Yurinskaya, Yaroslavl Oblast, a village in Florovsky Rural Okrug of Myshkinsky District of Yaroslavl Oblast